William Henry Browne (1800-1877) was an Anglican priest in Australia during the Nineteenth Century.

Browne was born in Mallow and educated at Trinity College, Dublin.

Browne was ordained in 1824. His first post was a curacy at Whitechurch. In 1828 he arrived at Hobart. In time he came the Archdeacon of Launceton.

References

1800 births
People from County Cork
Alumni of Trinity College Dublin
1877 deaths
Anglican archdeacons in Tasmania
19th-century Australian Anglican priests